António Alves Redol (29December 191129November 1969) was an influential Portuguese neorealist writer.

Life
Redol was born in 1911 in Vila Franca de Xira to Antonio Redol da Cruz, a shopkeeper, and Inocência Alves Redol. When he was fifteen, his articles were published in the local weekly newspaper, . After finishing secondary school in 1927, he traveled to Portuguese Angola where he stayed for three years. His stay in Angola influenced Redol's worldview and later literature.

In 1936, he married Maria dos Santos Mota.

Early work, 1930–1940 
Kangondo had an African feel. Redol continued to work with the newspapers to publish chronicles and tales about the social issues in Ribatejo.

Redol would not become known for his work as a journalist; instead, he became famous for his novels. In 1939, he published his first book, . According to the author,  was not intended as a piece of art, but rather as a report of the way of life of the peasants in Ribatejo.

1940—1950 

Redol's work is characterized by his commitment to study real-world experiences. Redol would meet with agricultural workers, such as the rice field workers near the Tagus river, and hear about their stories and experiences.

At the beginning of the 1940s, he joined the Portuguese Communist Party although it was then illegal to do so. Redol was arrested in May 1944. In November 1945, Redol was called to the Central Committee of the Movement of Democratic Unity and chose to actively participate in the campaigns for the fake elections held by the Salazar regime.

In 1947, he was nominated for the position of Secretary-General of the Portuguese section of  International PEN. In 1948, he participated in the World Congress of Intellectuals for Peace held in Wrocław, Poland.

Redol published the novel  in 1948; it was the first volume of a trilogy about the Portuguese wine-making region of Douro.

Later work, 1950–1970 
Alves Redol's later works include  (1958),  (1959), and finally,  (1962), considered the pinnacle of his work.

 was translated into English by Linton Lomas Barrett and published as A Man with Seven Names by Knopf in 1964.

Alves Redol died in Lisbon in 1969.

Works

Novels
 (1939)
 (1941)
 (1942)
 (1943)
 (1945)
 (1946)
 (1949)
 (1951)
 (1953)
 (1954)
 (1958)
 (1959)
 (1960)
 (1961)
 (1966)
 (1972)

Theatre
 (1945)
 (1948)
 (1967)
 (1972)

Short stories
 (1940)
 (1943)
 (1946)
 (1959)
 (1962)
 (1963)
 (1968)

Children's literature
 (1956)
 (1968)
 (1968)
 (1969)
 (1970)

Essays
 (1938)
 (1949)
 (1950)
 (1952)
 (1959)

Screenplays
 (1952)
 (1975)

Conferences
 (Edited by Union Française Universitaire - Paris) (1946)

Sources

External links
Alves Redol homepage (Portuguese)
Redol @ Infopédia (Portuguese)
Programme for the Alves Redol centenary (in Portuguese, but amply illustrated)

1911 births
1969 deaths
People from Vila Franca de Xira
Portuguese male writers
Portuguese Communist Party politicians
Portuguese anti-fascists
20th-century Portuguese people
20th-century Portuguese writers